= Protected polymorphism =

In population genetics, a protected polymorphism is a mechanism that maintains multiple alleles at a certain locus. In detail, any of the several alleles will follow certain dynamics; When a certain allele is high in frequency (p $\to$ 1), it will decrease in frequency in the future and by that avoid from being fixated in the population. On the contrary, when a given allele is low in frequency (p $\to$ 0) it will increase in frequency in the future, avoiding its extinction and maintaining polymorphism at the locus.
